Depende is the second album by the Spanish Latin rock group Jarabe de Palo, released in 1998.

Track listing 
 Depende - 4:22
 Pura Sangre - 4:06
 Te Miro y Tiemblo - 4:28
 Plaza de las Palmeras - 3:53
 Realidad o Sueño - 4:22
 Agua - 4:17
 Perro Apaleao - 3:22
 Vivo En Un Saco - 4:14
 Toca Mi Canción - 4:39
 Duerme Conmigo - 3:21
 Vive y Deja Vivir - 4:26
 Mi Mundo en Tu Mano - 3:24
 Adiós - 4:48
 A lo Loco [feat. Celia Cruz] - 4:13

Certifications

References

1998 albums
Jarabe de Palo albums